Saint-Eugène was a former parish municipality in the Chaudière-Appalaches region of Quebec.  On January 1, 2000, it amalgamated with L'Islet and L'Islet-sur-Mer to form a new municipality which was initially called L'Islet-sur-Mer–Saint-Eugène–L'Islet but soon changed its name to simply L'Islet.

References

Former municipalities in Quebec
Populated places disestablished in 2000